Talahi Island is a barrier island and census-designated place (CDP) in Chatham County, Georgia, United States. The population was 1,247 at the 2020 census. Located east of Savannah, Talahi Island is part of the Savannah Metropolitan Statistical Area.

Geography
The Talahi Island CDP is located in eastern Chatham County on the island of the same name, one of several islands lying in the tidal marshes between Savannah and the Atlantic Ocean. It is bordered to the northeast by the Bull River, to the northwest by Turner Creek, and to the south by Wilmington Island. U.S. Route 80 passes through the island community, leading west  into Savannah and east  to the highway's end at Tybee Island on the Atlantic shore.

Demographics

References

Census-designated places in Chatham County, Georgia
Census-designated places in Georgia (U.S. state)
Savannah metropolitan area
Populated coastal places in Georgia (U.S. state)